Degeneracy, degenerate, or degeneration may refer to:

Arts and entertainment
 Degenerate (album), a 2010 album by the British band Trigger the Bloodshed
 Degenerate art, a term adopted in the 1920s by the Nazi Party in Germany to describe modern art
 Decadent movement, often associated with degeneracy
 Dégénération, a single by Mylène Farmer
 Degeneration (Nordau), an 1892 book by Max Nordau
 Resident Evil: Degeneration, a 2008 film
 "Degenerate", a song by Blink-182 from the album Dude Ranch
 "Degenerates", a song by A Day to Remember from the album You're Welcome

Science, mathematics, and medicine

Mathematics 
 Degeneracy (mathematics), a limiting case in which a class of object changes its nature so as to belong to another, usually simpler, class
 Degeneracy (graph theory), a measure of the sparseness of a graph
 Degeneration (algebraic geometry), the act of taking a limit of a family of varieties
 Degenerate form, bilinear form f(x, y) on a vector space V is one such that the map from V to V* (the dual space of V) given by is not an isomorphism
 Degenerate distribution, the probability distribution of a random variable which only takes a single value
 Degenerate conic, a conic (a second-degree plane curve, the points of which satisfy an equation that is quadratic in one or the other or both variables) that fails to be an irreducible curve
 Degenerate dimension, a dimension key in the fact table that does not have its own dimension table, because all the interesting attributes have been placed in analytic dimensions. The term "degenerate dimension" was originated by Ralph Kimball

Quantum mechanics 
 Degenerate energy levels, different arrangements of a physical system which have the same energy
 Degenerate matter, a very highly compressed phase of matter which resists further compression because of quantum mechanical effects
 Degenerate semiconductor, a semiconductor with such a high doping-level that the material starts to act more like a metal than as a semiconductor

Other uses in science and medicine
 Degeneracy (biology), the ability of elements that are structurally different to perform the same function or yield the same output
 Codon degeneracy, in genetics
 Degeneration (medicine)
 Degenerative disease, a disease that causes deterioration over time
 Social degeneration, a late 19th–early 20th century sociological concept

Other uses 
 Degeneration, a type of semantic change

See also 
 D-Generation X, also spelled "Degeneration X", a professional wrestling tag team
 Decadence (disambiguation)
 Deterioration (disambiguation)
 Devolution (disambiguation)
 Regeneration (disambiguation) (antonym)